is a passenger railway station located in Minami-ku, Sakai, Osaka Prefecture, Japan, operated by the Semboku Rapid Railway. It is station number SB05. It is named for Kōmyōike Pond, an artificial lake that dates from 1936 and is itself named for Empress Kōmyō. A small monument at the lake commemorates the work of the Korean laborers who constructed it

Lines

Station layout
The station consists of one elevated island platform with the station building underneath.

Platforms

Adjacent stations

History
Kōmyōike Station opened on August 20, 1977.

Passenger statistics
In fiscal 2019, the station was used by an average of 30,149 passengers daily (boarding passengers only).

Surrounding area
 Senboku New Town residential area
 Sakai City Kamotani Gymnasium
 Sakai City South Library Miki Tabunkan
Sakai City Minami Children's Rehabilitation Center
Osaka Vocational Ability Development School for Persons with Disabilities

See also
List of railway stations in Japan

References

External links

Semboku Rapid Railway official page
Information on services near the station
Komyoike Pond

Railway stations in Japan opened in 1977
Railway stations in Osaka Prefecture
Sakai, Osaka